Lasse Arnesen (born 18 January 1965) is a Norwegian alpine skier. He was born in Oslo, and represented the club IL Heming. He competed at the 1992 Winter Olympics in Albertville. From the 1. November 2014, he is the secretary general of the Norwegian Orienteering Federation, succeeding Bjørnar Valstad.

References

External links
 

1965 births
Living people
Alpine skiers from Oslo
Norwegian male alpine skiers
Olympic alpine skiers of Norway
Alpine skiers at the 1992 Winter Olympics
Norwegian sports executives and administrators